The Tom W. Davis Tower is a clock tower at The Ohio State University in Columbus, Ohio. It is located near the North Recreation Center and features a 20x40 foot light-emitting diode display and a large clock. It was completed in autumn of 2017. The tower displays inscribed quotes from William McKinley and Roberto Clemente at its base.

History
The tower was named after Tom W. Davis, in honor of his gift of 1.4 million USD to The Ohio State University.

References

External links
 

Buildings and structures in Columbus, Ohio
Clock towers in Ohio
Ohio State University